Teodoro Buontempo (21 January 1946 – 24 April 2013) was an Italian politician.

Born in Carunchio, Chieti, graduated in accounting, Buontempo started the first political experiences in Ortona, then, in 1968, he moved to Rome where he founded one of the first free Italian radios, "Radio Alternativa", whose headquarters in Via Sommacampagna became the focus of dozens of initiatives by the young members of the MSI-DN party. Member of the Central Committee of the MSI-DN from the 70s, in 1981 he was elected city councilor of Rome, and promptly re-elected until 1997. He was also  member of the Italian parliament from 1992 al 2006, at first with MSI-DN, later with Alleanza Nazionale. In 2007 he came out from the party due to disagreements with the secretary Gianfranco Fini and joined the movement La Destra in which he had the role of president until his death. From 2010 until his death he was also assessor to the House of the Lazio Regional government under the Renata Polverini presidency.

References 

1946 births
2013 deaths 
People from the Province of Chieti
Italian Social Movement politicians
National Alliance (Italy) politicians
The Right (Italy) politicians
Deputies of Legislature XI of Italy
Deputies of Legislature XII of Italy
Deputies of Legislature XIII of Italy
Deputies of Legislature XIV of Italy
Deputies of Legislature XV of Italy
Politicians of Abruzzo